A  is a type of Shinto shrine which enshrines the three Kumano mountains: Hongū, Shingū, and Nachi [].

The point of origin of the Kumano cult is the Kumano Sanzan shrine complex in Wakayama Prefecture, which comprises  (Shingū, Wakayama), Kumano Hongū Taisha (Tanabe, Wakayama) and Kumano Nachi Taisha (Nachikatsuura, Wakayama Prefecture).

Kumano Sanzan 
The three Kumano Sanzan shrines are the Sōhonsha ("head shrines") of all Kumano shrines and lie between 20 and 40 km from each other. The great Kumano Sanzan complex also includes two Buddhist temples, Seiganto-ji and Fudarakusan-ji.

The religious significance of the Kumano region goes back to prehistoric times and therefore predates all modern religions in Japan. The area is still considered a place of physical healing. Each shrine initially had its own separate form of nature worship, but in the 10th century, under the influence of Buddhism, the three came to be worshiped together as the three deities of Kumano. Because at the time Japanese kami were believed to be emanations of buddhas (honji suijaku theory), the three came to be associated with Buddhas. Kuniyasutamahime became associated with Sahasrabhūja Avalokiteśvara (Senju Kannon, "Thousand-Armed Avalokiteśvara"), Bhaisajyaguru (Yakushi Nyōrai) and Amitābha (Amida Nyōrai). The site became, therefore, a unique example of shinbutsu-shūgō, the fusion between Buddhism and Japanese indigenous religion. Thereafter the Kumano Sanzan site attracted many worshipers and became a popular pilgrimage destination. In the 11th century pilgrims were mostly members of the imperial family or aristocrats, but four centuries later they were mostly commoners. The visit was referred to as the  because they could be seen winding through the valleys like so many ants.

See also 
Kumano Shrine (Yamagata)
The Tale of the Heike
Acts of Worship

Notes

References 
 D. Max Moerman, Localizing Paradise: Kumano Pilgrimage and the Religious Landscape of Premodern Japan. Harvard University Press, 2004. 
  Moerman, David (1997). The ideology of landscape and the theater of state: Insei pilgrimage to Kumano (1090–1220), Japanese Journal of Religious Studies 24 (3-4), 347-374

External links

Japanese Wikipedia article ":ja:熊野神社" accessed on June 12, 2008
Tanabe City Kumano Tourism Bureau

Shinto shrines in Japan
Kumano faith